This list of SPI games includes games published by Simulations Publications, Inc. as separate titles, as well as part of their magazines Strategy & Tactics and Ares.

Games

0–9
 1812: The Campaign of Napoleon in Russia (1972)
 1914 Revision Kit (Test Series, 1969)
 1918 (Test Series, 1970 / Second edition, 1972)

A
 Across Suez (1980)
 A Mighty Fortress (1977)
 Acre: Richard Lionheart's Siege (The Art of Siege quadrigame, 1978)
 After the Holocaust (1977)
 Agincourt (1978)
 Air War (1977)
 The Alamo (1981)
 Albion: Land of Faerie (Ares #11, 1981)
 Alma (Crimean War quadrigame, 1978)
 The American Civil War: 1861–1865 (S&T #43, 1974)
 The American Revolution: 1775-1783 (1972)
 Antietam: The Bloodiest Day, 17 September 1862 (Blue & Gray quadrigame, 1975)
 Anzio Beachhead (S&T #20, 1969)
 The Ardennes Offensive (1973)
 Arena of Death (Ares #4, 1980)
 Armada: The War With Spain 1585-1604 (S&T #72, 1979)
 Armageddon: Tactical Combat, 3000-500 BC (S&T #34, 1972)
 Arnhem (Westwall quadrigame, 1976)
 The Art of Siege (quadrigame, 1979)
 Atlantic Wall (1978)
 Austerlitz (1973)

B
 Balaclava (Crimean War quadrigame, 1978)
 BAOR: The Thin Red Line in the 1980s (S&T #88, 1981)
 Barbarian Kings (Ares #3, 1980)
 Barbarossa: The Russo-German War 1941-45 (Test Series, 1969 / Second edition, 1971)
 Bastogne (S&T #20, 1969)
 Bastogne: The Desperate Defense, December 1944 (Westwall quadrigame, 1976)
 The Battle for Cassino (S&T #71, 1978)
 The Battle for France (S&T #27, 1971)
 Battle for Germany (S&T #50, 1975)
 The Battle for Jerusalem (1977)
 Battle for Stalingrad (1980)
 Battle for the Ardennes (1978)
 The Battle of Austerlitz (1980)
 The Battle of Borodino: Napoleon in Russia 1812 (1972)
 Battle of Britain Revision Kit, (Test Series, 1970)
 The Battle of Moscow (S&T #24, 1970)
 The Battle of Nations (1975)
 Battle of the Wilderness: Gaining the Initiative, May 5-6, 1864 (Blue & Gray II quadrigame, 1975)
 The Battles of Bull Run (1973)
 BattleFleet Mars (1977)
 La Belle Alliance: The Battle of Waterloo (Napoleon's Last Battles quadrigame, 1976)
 Berlin '85 (S&T #79, 1980)
 The Big Red One (originally published as Bulge, 1980) 
 Blitzkrieg Module System (1969)
 The Black Prince: The Battle of Navarette, 1367 (Great Medieval Battles quadrigame, 1979)
 Bloody April: The Battle of Shiloh, 1862 (1979)
 Bloody Ridge (Island War quadrigame, 1975)
 Blue & Gray (1975)
 Blue & Gray II (1975)
 The Battle of Borodino: Napoleon in Russia 1812 (S&T #32, 1972)
 Breakout & Pursuit: The Battle for France, 1944 (1972)
 Breitenfeld (S&T #55, companion game to Thirty Years War quadrigame, 1976)
 The Brusilov Offensive (The Great War in the East quadrigame, 1978)
 Bulge (also published as The Big Red One, 1980)
 Bundeswehr: Northern Germany, late 1970s (1977)

C
 'CA': Tactical Naval Warfare in the Pacific 1941-43 (S&T #38, 1973)
 The Campaign for North Africa (1978)
 Canadian Civil War (1977)
 Caporetto, 1917 (The Great War in the East quadrigame, 1978)
 Cauldron (North Africa quadrigame, 1976)
 Cedar Mountain: The Prelude to Bull Run (S&T #86, 1981)
 Celles (Battles for the Ardennes quadrigame, 1978)
 Cemetery Hill (Blue & Gray quadrigame, 1975)
 Centurion: Tactical Warfare, 100 BC-600 AD (S&T #25, 1971)
 Chariot: Tactical Warfare in the Biblical Age, 3000-500 B.C. (PRESTAGS, 1975)
 Chattanooga: Gateway to Victory, Nov. 24-25, 1863 (Blue & Gray II quadrigame, 1975)
 Chicago, Chicago! (S&T #21, 1970)
 Chickamauga: The Last Victory, 20 September 1863 (Blue & Gray quadrigame, 1975)
 The China War (S&T #76, 1979)
 Chinese Farm (Modern Battles quadrigame, 1975)
 Citadel of Blood (Ares #5, 1980)
 City-Fight (1979)
 Clervaux (Battles for the Ardennes quadrigame, 1978)
 Cobra (S&T #65, 1977)
 Combat Command (S&T #30, 1972)
 Combined Arms (S&T #46, 1974)
 Commando (1979)
 The Conquerors (1977)
 Conquistador (S&T #58, 1976)
 The Creature That Ate Sheboygan (1979)
 Crete (S&T #18, 1969)
 Crusader (North Africa quadrigame, 1976)
 The Crusades (S&T #70, 1978)

D
 Dallas (1980)
 Dark Ages: Tactical Warfare, 500-1300 (1971)
 Dawn of the Dead (1978)
 Deathmaze (1979)
 Deployment (Test Series, 1969, also titled Tactical Game 10)
 Demons (1979)
 Descent on Crete (1978)
 Desert War: Tactical Warfare in North Africa (1973)
 The Desert Fox (S&T #87, 1981)
 Destruction of Army Group Center (S&T #36, 1973)
 Dixie (S&T #54, 1976)
 DragonQuest (1980)
 Dragonslayer (1981)
 Dreadnought: Surface Combat In The Battleship Era, 1906-45 (1975)
 Dresden (S&T #75, 1979)
 Drive on Stalingrad (1977)
 Drive on Washington (1980)

E
 The East is Red: The Sino Soviet War (S&T #42, 1974)
 El Alamein: Battles in North Africa, 1942 (1973)
 Empires of the Middle Ages (1980)

F
 The Fall of Rome (S&T #39, 1973)
 The Fast Carriers (1976)
 Fifth Corp (S&T #82, 1980)
 Fighting Sail: Sea Combat in the Age of Canvas and Shot 1775-1815 (S&T #85, 1981)
 Firefight (1976)
 The First World War (War in Europe expansion)
 The Flight of the Goeben: World War I Naval Operations in the Mediterranean (S&T #21, 1970)
 Flying Circus (S&T #31, 1972)
 Flying Fortress (Test Series, 1969 & 1970)
 Flying Tigers (Test Series, 1970)
 Four Battles from the Crimean War (quadrigame, 1977)
 Four Battles in North Africa (quadrigame, 1976)
 Four Battles of Army Group South (quadrigame, 1979)
 Foxbat & Phantom (1973)
 The Franco Prussian War (1972)
 Frederick the Great (S&T #49, 1975)
 Fredericksburg: The Union Repulsed (Blue & Gray II quadrigame, 1975)
 Freedom in the Galaxy (1979)
 Freiburg (Thirty Years War quadrigame, 1976)
 Frigate: Sea War in the Age of Sail (1974)
 Fulda Gap (1977)

G
 Global War (1975)
 Golan (1975)
 Gondor: The Siege of Minas Tirith (1977)
 La Grande Armée (1972)
 Great Medieval Battles (1979)
 The Great War in the East (quadrigame, 1978)
 Grenadier: Tactical Warfare 1680-1850 (1972)
 Grunt (S&T #26, 1971)

H
 Highway to the Reich (1977)
 Hof Gap (1980)
 Hooker and Lee (Blue & Gray II quadrigame, 1975)
 Hurtgen Forest, (Westwall quadrigame, 1976)

I
 Inkerman (Crimean War quadrigame, 1978)
 Introduction to Adventure Gaming (1981)
 Invasion: America (1976)
 Island War: Four Pacific Battles (quadrigame, 1975)
 Italy (Test Series, 1969)

J
 Jena-Auerstadt: The Battle for Prussia (Napoleon at War quadrigame, 1975)
 John Carter: Warlord of Mars (1979)

K
 The Kaiser's Battle (S&T #83, 1980)
 KampfPanzer: Armored Combat, 1937–40 (S&T #41, 1973)
 Kasserine (North Africa quadrigame, 1976)
 Kharkov: The Soviet Spring Offensive (S&T #68, 1978)
 Kiev (1979)
 King Arthur: The Battle of Stonehenge, 536 (Great Medieval Battles quadrigame, 1979)
 Korea: The Mobile War (Test Series, 1969 / Second edition in 1971)
 Korsun (1979)
 Kursk: Operation Zitadelle (1971)
 Kursk: History's Greatest Tank Battle, July 1943 (1980)

L
 Lee Moves North (1972, originally titled Lee at Gettysburg)
 Legion (PRESTAGS, 1975)
 Leipzig: The Battle of Nations (Test Series, 1969 / Second edition, 1972)
 Leningrad: The Advance of Army Group North, Summer 1941 (1980)
 Leyte: Return to the Philippines, October 1944 (Island War quadrigame, 1975)
 Ligny: Incomplete Victory (Napoleon's Last Battles quadrigame, 1976)
 Lille: The Classic Vauban Siege (The Art of Siege quadrigame, 1978)
 Lost Battles: Operational Combat in Russia (1971)
 Lützen  (Thirty Years War quadrigame, 1976)

M
 Marengo: Napoleon in Italy, 14 June 1800 (Napoleon at War quadrigame, 1975)
 The Marne: Home Before the Leaves Fall (1972)
 MechWar '77 (1975)
 MechWar 2 (1979)
 Middle Earth
 A Mighty Fortress (1977)
 Minuteman: The Second American Revolution (1976)
 Modern Battles: Four Contemporary Conflicts (1975)
 Modern Battles II: Four Contemporary Conflicts (1977)
 The Moscow Campaign (1972)
 Mukden: Sino-Soviet Combat in the '70s (Modern Battles: Four Contemporary Conflicts quadrigame, 1975)
 Musket & Pike (1973)

N
 Napoleon at War: Four Battles (quadrigame, 1975)
 Napoleon at Waterloo (1971)
 Napoleon's Art of War (S&T #75, 1979)
 Napoleon's Last Battles (quadrigame, 1976)
 NATO Division Commander (1979)
 NATO: Operational Combat in Europe in the 1970s (1973)
 The Next War: Modern Conflict in Europe (1978)
 Ney vs. Wellington (S&T #74, 1979)
 Nordlingen (Thirty Years War quadrigame, 1976)
 Normandy: The Invasion of Europe 1944 (Test Series, 1969)

O
 Objective Moscow (1978)
 October War: Doctrine and Tactics in the Yom Kippur Conflict, 1973 (S&T #61, 1977)
 Oil War (S&T #52, 1975)
 Okinawa: The Last Battle (Island War quadrigame, 1975)
 The Omega War (1983)
 Operation Grenade (S&T #84, 1981)
 Operation Olympic: The Invasion of Japan 1 November 1945 (S&T #45, 1974)
 Operation Typhoon: The German Assault on Moscow, 1941 (1978)
 Outreach (1976)

P
 Panzer '44: Tactical Combat in Western Europe, 1944–45 (1975)
 Panzer Armee Afrika (S&T #40, 1973)
 Panzer Battles (S&T #73, 1979)
 Panzergruppe Guderian (S&T #57, 1976)
 Paratroop (S&T #77, 1979)
 Patrol! (1975)
 Patton's 3rd Army (S&T #78, 1980)
 Pea Ridge (1980)
 Phalanx (1971)
 The Plot to Assassinate Hitler (S&T #59, 1976)
 PRESTAGS Master Pack (1975)
 The Punic Wars: Rome vs Carthage, 264-146 B.C. (S&T #53, 1975)

Q
 Quatre Bras: Stalemate on the Brussels Road (Napoleon's Last Battles quadrigame, 1976)

R
 Ragnarok (1981) 
 Raid: Commando Operations in the 20th Century (S&T #64, 1977)
 Red Star/White Star (1972)
 Red Star/White Star (1979, also part of MechWar 2)
 Red Sun Rising (1977)
 Remagen: Bridgehead on the Rhine, March 1945 (Westwall quadrigame, 1976)
 Renaissance of Infantry (S&T #22, 1970)
 Revolt in the East (S&T #56, 1976)
 Rifle & Saber (1973)
 Road to Richmond (S&T #60, 1977)
 Robert at Bannockburn: The Battle of Bannockburn, 1314 (Great Medieval Battles quadrigame, 1979)
 Rocroi ( Thirty Years War quadrigame, 1976)
 Russia, 1944 (Test Series, 1969, also titled Tactical Game 3)
 Russian Civil War (1976)

S
 Saipan: Conquest of the Marianas (Island War quadrigame, 1975)
 Sauron (1977)
 Scrimmage: Tactical Professional Football (S&T #37, 1973)
 Search & Destroy: Tactical Combat Vietnam 1965-1966 (1975)
 Seelöwe: The German Invasion of Britain, 1940 (1974)
 Serbia/Galicia: Austria-Hungary at War, 1914 (The Great War in the East quadrigame, 1978)
 Sevastapol: The First Modern Siege (The Art of Siege quadrigame, 1978)
 Shiloh (Blue & Gray quadrigame, 1975)
 Sicily: The Race for Messina (S&T #89, 1981)
 The Siege of Constantinople (S&T #66, 1978)
 Sinai (1973)
 Sixth Fleet (S&T #48, 1975)
 Sniper! (1973)
 Soldiers (1972)
 Solomons Campaign (1973)
 Sorcerer (1975)
 South Africa (S&T #62 May/June 1977)
 Spartan (PRESTAGS, 1975)
 Spies (1981)
 Spitfire: Tactical Aerial Combat in Europe 1939-42 (1973)
 Star Trader (Ares #12, 1982)
 Starforce: Alpha Centauri (1974)
 StarGate (1979)
 StarSoldier (1977)
 Stonewall: The Battle of Kernstown (S&T #67, 1978)
 Strategy I (1971)
 Strike Force One (1975)
 Suez to Golan (Mech War 2, 1979)
 Swords & sorcery: Quest and Conquest in the Age of Magic (1978)
 Sword and the Stars (1981)

T
 T-34 (S&T #23, 1970)
 Tamburlaine the Great: The Battle of Angorra, 1402 (Great Medieval Battles quadrigame, 1979)
 Tank! (S&T #44, 1974)
 Tannenberg (Test Series, 1969 / Second edition published in S&T #69 as companion game to The Great War in the East quadrigame, 1978)
 Task Force (1981)
 Tchernaya River (Crimean War quadrigame, 1978)
 Terrible Swift Sword (1976)
 Thirty Years War (quadrigame, 1976)
 Time Tripper (1980)
 Titan Strike (1979)
 Tito and his Partisan Army: Yugoslavia, 1941-45 (1980)
 To the Green Fields Beyond (1978)
 Turning Point: The Battle of Stalingrad (1972)
  Twelve O'Clock High (Test Series, 1970) 
 Tyre: Alexander's Siege and Assault (The Art of Siege quadrigame, 1978)

U
 Up Scope! Tactical Submarine Warfare in the 20th Century (1978)
 Universe (1981)
 U.S.N. (S&T #29, 1971)

V
 Vector 3 (1979)
 Veracruz: The US invasion of Mexico 1847 (S&T #63, 1977)
 Viking (PRESTAGS, 1975)
 Von Hindenburg in Poland (The Great War in the East quadrigame, 1978)
 Voyage of the BSM Pandora (Ares #6, 1981)

W
 Wacht am Rhein (1977)
 War Between the States (1978)
 War in Europe (1976)
 War in the East (1974)
 War in the Ice (1978)
 War in the Pacific (1978)
 War in the West (1976)
 War of the Ring (1977)
 Wavre: The Lost Opportunity (Napoleon's Last Battles quadrigame, 1976)
 Wellington's Victory: Battle of Waterloo (1976)
 Westwall: Four Battles to Germany (quadrigame, 1976)
 The Wilderness Campaign: Lee vs. Grant, 1864 (1972)
 Wilson's Creek (S&T #80, 1980)
 Winter War (S&T #33, 1972)
 Wolfpack (S&T #47, 1974)
 World War I (S&T #51, 1975)
 World War II: European Theater of Operations (1973)
 World War 3 (1975)
 Wreck of the B.S.M. Pandora (Ares #2, 1980)
 Wurzburg (1975)

Y
 Year of the Rat, Vietnam, 1972 (S&T #35, 1972)
 Yeoman (PRESTAGS, 1975)
 Yugoslavia: The Battles for Zagreb, 1979 (Modern Battles II quadrigame, 1977)

References

The SPI Compendium

SPI games